Mark Rosman (born August 15, 1957) is an American film director, film producer, television director and screenwriter.

Background 
Rosman is the son of a Beverly Hills dermatologist. He has a brother, a lawyer, and a sister. After graduating from Beverly Hills High School, Rosman went to UCLA but left after two years when he wasn't accepted into the film program there. Rosman was accepted into New York University's film program, where he graduated.

Career 
During his senior year at NYU, he worked as a voluntary assistant director on Brian De Palma's Home Movies.

Rosman launched his career with The House on Sorority Row. Rosman was originally hired to direct the 1984 horror film Mutant, but was replaced by John Cardos early in the production after the studio objected to the way he was shooting the film. In 1985, Rosman had just finished the Disney Channel film The Blue Yonder and was set to work on Spot Marks the X when the Writers Guild went on strike. In 1992, he wrote the script for the thriller Evolver and directed The Force. In 1997, Rosman directed The Invader.

In 1998, Rosman cowrote the script for and directed The Wonderful World of Disney film Life-Size, which led to directing the television film Model Behavior. Rosman then went to work on a number of television shows, but all of them were eventually canceled. He then directed 2004's A Cinderella Story and 2005's The Perfect Man, both films starring Hilary Duff.

Rosman has also worked in episodic television, directing episodes of Lizzie McGuire (his first time working with Hilary Duff), Even Stevens, Ghost Whisperer, The New Alfred Hitchcock Presents, State of Grace and Greek.

References

External links 

The Director on Sorority Row: An Interview with Mark Rosman – February 2001

1957 births
American film producers
American male screenwriters
American television directors
Living people
Tisch School of the Arts alumni
People from Beverly Hills, California
University of California, Los Angeles alumni
Film directors from California
Screenwriters from California